Özil is a Turkish surname constructed by fusing the Turkish words Öz ("self", "essence", "extract") and İl ("city", "province").

Surname

Ozil de Cadartz, French troubadour
Mesut Özil (born 1988), German footballer

See also
Ozili or Ojili, a Mandal in Nellore district in the state of Andhra Pradesh in India
Ozillac, a commune in the Charente-Maritime department in the Nouvelle-Aquitaine region in southwestern France.